Morteza Mohammadkhan (1 January 1946 – 5 November 2022) was an Iranian politician and economist who was Minister of Finance from 1993 to 1997 in Akbar Hashemi Rafsanjani's second cabinet.

Early life and education
Mohammadkhan was born on 1 January 1946 in Tehran. He was an economics professor at Khaje Nasir University of Technology. He held a BS in Industrial Engineering from San Jose State University and also a MS in Economics from San Jose State University and a PhD from Ponna University.

Career
Mohammadkhan was the founder of the first Islamic Association of Students abroad, including those along the Ruhollah Khomeini in Paris. After Iranian Revolution, he became a member of Islamic Republican Party's center leadership. He is one of the survivors of Hafte Tir bombing which led to the death of Mohammad Beheshti, IRP's secretary-general. He was pulled out of rubble alive after four hours. He then became CEO of Iran's Post Company. He was Deputy Minister of Interior in Political affairs from 1988 to 1989. In 1989, he became CEO of Customs Agency of Iran. After Akbar Hashemi Rafsanjani was reelected as President in 1993, Mohammadkhan was nominated by him as Minister of Finance. He was approved by the Parliament. He was Iran's Minister of Economy for four years and was succeeded by Hossein Namazi in 1997. He was one of the founders of Moderation and Development Party and was latterly Vice President of Center for Strategic Research.

Personal life and death
Mohammadkhan died on 6 November 2022, at the age of 76.

References

1946 births
2022 deaths
Government ministers of Iran
Finance ministers of Iran
Iranian Vice Ministers
Politicians from Tehran
Executives of Construction Party politicians
Moderation and Development Party politicians
Islamic Republican Party politicians
20th-century Iranian politicians
Iranian industrial engineers
20th-century Iranian engineers